The Berg Mountains are two ridges of six nunataks in Antarctica,  south of Cape Buromskiy, Krylov Peninsula. They were photographed by U.S. Navy Operation Highjump, 1946–47, the Soviet Antarctic Expedition, 1958, and the Australian National Antarctic Research Expeditions, 1959. The feature was visited by an airborne survey party from the Soviet expedition and called "Gory L'va Berga" after the Soviet geographer Lev Berg.

References 

Mountain ranges of Oates Land
Nunataks of Antarctica